In spherical astronomy, the parallactic angle is the angle between the great circle through a celestial object and the zenith, and the hour circle of the object. It is usually denoted q. In the triangle zenith—object—celestial pole, the parallactic angle will be the position angle of the zenith at the celestial object. Despite its name, this angle is unrelated with parallax. The parallactic angle is zero or 180° when the object crosses the meridian.

Uses 
For ground-based observatories, the Earth atmosphere acts like a prism which disperses light
of different wavelengths such that a star generates a rainbow along the direction that points
to the zenith. So given an astronomical picture with a coordinate system with a known direction
to the Celestial pole, the parallactic angle represents the direction of that prismatic effect relative
to that reference direction. Knowledge of that angle is needed to align Atmospheric Dispersion Correctors with the beam axis of the telescope 

Depending on the type of mount of the telescope, this angle may also affect the orientation of the celestial object's disk as seen in a telescope. With an equatorial mount, the cardinal points of the celestial object's disk are aligned with the vertical and horizontal direction of the view in the telescope. With an altazimuth mount, those directions are rotated by the amount of the parallactic angle. The cardinal points referred to here are the points on the limb located such that a line from the center of the disk through them will point to one of the celestial poles or 90° away from them; these are not the cardinal points defined by the object's axis of rotation.

The orientation of the disk of the Moon, as related to the horizon, changes throughout its diurnal motion and the parallactic angle changes equivalently. This is also the case with other celestial objects.

In an ephemeris, the position angle of the midpoint of the bright limb of the Moon or planets, and the position angles of their North poles may be tabulated. If this angle is measured from the North point on the limb, it can be converted to an angle measured from the zenith point (the vertex) as seen by an observer by subtracting the parallactic angle. The position angle of the bright limb is directly related to that of the subsolar point.

Derivation
The vector algebra to derive the standard formula is equivalent to the calculation of the 
long derivation for the compass course.
The sign of the angle is basically kept, north over east in both cases,
but as astronomers look at stars from the inside of the celestial sphere, 

In the equatorial system of right ascension  and declination 
the star is at

In the same coordinate system the zenith is found by inserting , 
into the transformation formulas

where  is the observer's geographic latitude,  the star's altitude,
 the zenith distance, and  the local sidereal time. The North Celestial Pole is at

The normalized cross product is the rotation axis that turns the star into the direction of the zenith:

Finally  is the third axis of the tilted coordinate system and the direction into which the star is moved on the great circle towards the zenith.

The plane tangential to the celestial sphere at the star is spanned by the unit vectors to the north,

and to the east

These are orthogonal:

The parallactic angle  is the angle of the initial section of the great circle
at s, east of north,

(The previous formula is the sine formula of spherical trigonometry.)
divide both expressions through these without losing signs; eventually

yields the angle in the full range . The advantage of this expression is that it 
of the hour angle 
takes care of this.

the angle changes with a period of a sidereal day .
Let dots denote time derivatives; then the hour angle changes as

and the time derivative of the  expression is 

The value derived above always refers to the North Celestial Pole as the origin of coordinates, even if that is not visible (i.e., if the telescope is south of the Equator). Some authors introduce more complicated formulas with variable signs to derive similar angles for telescopes south of the Equator that use the South Celestial Pole as the reference.

See also
 Libration
 Equatorial mount
 Altazimuth mount

Further reading

References

Astronomical coordinate systems
Angle
Observational astronomy